The Wulai Hot Spring is a hot spring in Wulai District, New Taipei, Taiwan.

Name
The name Wulai comes from Atayal language “Ulay” which means streaming water.

Geology
The hot spring town situates in the Xueshan Range, and spreads out around the confluence of the Tonghou River and the Nanshi River. The water of the hot spring is clear and odorless with a temperature up to 80°C. Two types of hot springs exist in the area, which are those in hotels and resorts and also the open air ones along the Nanshi River banks. While many of them offer a set course with meals, there are also some spas that require guests to wear bathing suits.

On the left bank of the Nanshi River, there was a free open-air bath with bathing suits on, but it was removed by the New Taipei City Government on May 18, 2017 due to a violation of the Water Conservation Law.

Transportation
The hot spring is accessible by bus 849 from Xindian Station of Taipei Metro.

See also
 List of tourist attractions in Taiwan
 Taiwanese hot springs

References

Hot springs of Taiwan
Landforms of New Taipei
Tourist attractions in New Taipei
Wulai District